Acalolepta cervina is a species of longhorn beetle in the family Cerambycidae. It was described by Hope in 1831. It is known from India, China, Myanmar, Laos, and Nepal.

References

Acalolepta
Beetles described in 1831